Robert Retschke (born 17 December 1980 in Bernau bei Berlin) is a German cyclist, who currently rides for UCI Continental team .

Major results

2003
 1st Stage 4 Brandenburg Rundfahrt
2004
 6th Rund um die Hainleite
2005
 1st  National Hill Climb Championships
 1st Rund um Düren
 9th Rund um Köln
2006
 1st  National Hill Climb Championships
 2nd Rund um die Hainleite
 5th GP Triberg-Schwarzwald
 7th Grote Prijs Jef Scherens
2007
 5th Rund um die Hainleite
 6th Overall Regio-Tour
 7th Grote Prijs Jef Scherens
 9th Rund um die Nurnberger Altstadt
2008
 1st Stage 3 Regio-Tour
 2nd GP Briek Schotte
 4th Sparkassen Giro
2009
 1st Grand Prix de la ville de Pérenchies
 1st Grand Prix des Marbriers
 2nd Grand Prix Cristal Energie
 9th Druivenkoers Overijse
2010
 1st  National Hill Climb Championships
 2nd Ronde Pévéloise
 4th Grand Prix de la ville de Pérenchies
 8th Sparkassen Giro Bochum
 8th Rund um Düren
 8th Overall Flèche du Sud

References

External links

1980 births
Living people
German male cyclists
People from Bernau bei Berlin
Cyclists from Brandenburg
People from Bezirk Frankfurt
21st-century German people